Rachel Lichtenstein is a writer, artist and archivist.

In 1999 she wrote Rodinsky's Room with Iain Sinclair, and since then she has published Rodinsky's Whitechapel (1999) and On Brick Lane (2007). This last will be joined by two other books, Hatton Garden and Portobello Road to form a trilogy on London street markets.

In 2003, she became the British Library's first Pearson Creative Research Fellow, producing a work entitled Add. 17469: A Little Dust Whispered – both as an installation within the Library, and a subsequent book.

Works
Books
Rodinsky's Room, with Iain Sinclair (Granta Books, 1999)
Rodinsky's Whitechapel, (Granta Books, 1999)
On Brick Lane, {Hamish Hamilton, 2007}
Diamond Street: The Hidden World of Hatton Garden(2012)
Estuary: Out from London to the Sea' (Hamish Hamilton, 2016)
InstallationsShoah (1993)Add. 17469: A Little Dust Whispered'' (2003)

See also
Museum of Immigration and Diversity

References

Year of birth missing (living people)
Living people
20th-century British novelists
21st-century British novelists
Psychogeographers